Walkwalkwalk (2005–2010) is a British artist collective consisting of Gail Burton, Serena Korda and Clare Qualmann. Based in London, their work focuses on their own routine walks in the Bethnal Green neighborhood of East London, as well as overlooked and forgotten spaces. Walkwalkwalk identify their move to walking as in part a response to monetary requirement and the financial restrictions present of living  in London. Their work looks to bring attention to overlooked and forgotten spaces and create alternative modes of engagement with the city.

Their work draws on a sources ranging from the never completed 1921 season of Dada excursions to Iain Sinclair's psychogeographic explorations in London. Through their walks they look to create new an 'archaeology of the familiar and the forgotten'. Deirdre Heddon and Cathy Turner note that Walkwalkwalk "consciously détourn Debord’s expression of outrage [over the limited triangle of movement most people inhabit] by specifically mapping their own daily routes to define a triangle: ‘rather than diverging from it we decided we would explore relationships within it'". Heddon and Turner refer to their work as "a sort of anti-dérive", and their practice is situated within and responds to critical and resistant artistic walking traditions.

Their work includes group walks, as well as flyposting stories of their walks, maps, films, and walking instructions (See Chip Shop Walk, Ways to Wander).

Selected exhibitions 
 Chip Shop Tour of E8 (2007), E8- The Heart of Hackney, Transition Gallery, London
 Nightwalks (2008), Stories from the Exeter Archive
 walk walk walk: stories from the Bethnal Green archive (2010), a permanent installation in the Bethnal Green Old Town Hall.
 walk walk walk (2013), Walk On: 40 Years of Walking, Pitshangar Manor Gallery, Northern Gallery of Contemporary Art, mac Birmingham, Plymouth City Museum and Gallery

Selected publications 
 Gail Burton, Serena Korda, and Clare Qualmann (2009) Walkwalkwalk: Stories from the Exeter Archive. London: Site Projects.

References 

Walking art